Matilda (c.1105 – 3 May 1152) was Countess of Boulogne in her own right from 1125 and Queen of England from the accession of her husband, Stephen, in 1136 until her death in 1152. She supported Stephen in his struggle for the English throne against their mutual cousin Empress Matilda. She played an unusually active role for a woman of the period when her husband was captured, and proved herself an effective general who managed to force the Empress to release Stephen. Under the agreement that settled the civil war, the Queen's children did not inherit the English throne; however, her three surviving children ruled Boulogne in turn as Eustace IV, William I, and Marie I.

Background
Matilda was born in Boulogne, France. Her father was Count Eustace III of Boulogne. Her mother, Mary, was the daughter of King Malcolm III of Scotland and Saint Margaret of Scotland. Through her maternal grandmother, Matilda was descended from the Anglo-Saxon kings of England.

Countess of Boulogne
In 1125, Matilda married Stephen of Blois, Count of Mortain, who possessed a large honour in England. When Matilda's father abdicated and retired to a monastery the same year, this was joined with Boulogne and the similarly large English honour Matilda inherited.

On Eustace III's death, Matilda and her husband became joint rulers of Boulogne. Two children, a son and a daughter, were born to the countess and count of Boulogne during the reign of King Henry I of England, who had granted them a residence in London. The son was named Baldwin, after Matilda's uncle King Baldwin I of Jerusalem. The daughter was named Matilda. Baldwin died in early childhood and the young Matilda is thought to have died during childhood too, although she lived long enough to be espoused to Waleran de Meulan, Earl of Worcester.

Queenship 

On the death of Henry I of England in 1135, Stephen rushed to England, taking advantage of Boulogne's control of the closest seaports, and was crowned king, beating his rival, the Empress Matilda. Matilda of Boulogne was heavily pregnant at that time and crossed the Channel after giving birth to a son, William, who would one day succeed as count of Boulogne. Matilda was crowned queen at Easter, on 22 March 1136.

Matilda was a supporter of the Knights Templar. She founded Cressing Temple in Essex in 1137 and Temple Cowley in Oxford in 1139. Like her predecessor, Matilda of Scotland, she had a close relationship with the Holy Trinity Priory at Aldgate. She took the prior as her confessor and two of her children were buried there.

In the civil war that followed, known as the Anarchy, Matilda proved to be her husband's strongest supporter. When England was invaded in 1138, she called troops from Boulogne and its ally Flanders, and besieged Dover Castle with success and then went north to Durham, where she made a treaty with David I of Scotland in 1139.

After Stephen was captured at the Battle of Lincoln in 1141, she rallied the king's partisans, and raised an army with the help of William of Ypres. While the Empress Matilda waited in London to prepare her coronation, Matilda and Stephen's brother Henry of Blois had her chased out of the city. The Empress Matilda went on to besiege Henry of Blois at Winchester. Matilda of Boulogne then commanded her army to attack the besiegers. There was a rout in which the Empress's half-brother, Robert of Gloucester, was captured. The two Matildas then agreed to exchange prisoners and Stephen ruled as king again.

Matilda died of a fever at Hedingham Castle, Essex, England, and is buried at Faversham Abbey, which she and her husband founded.

Issue
Stephen and Matilda had three sons:
Eustace IV, Count of Boulogne, married Constance of France, no issue
Baldwin of Boulogne (d. before 1135)
William of Blois, Count of Mortain and Boulogne and Earl of Surrey, married Isabel de Warenne, no issue

They also had two daughters:

Matilda of Boulogne, married Waleran de Beaumont, 1st Earl of Worcester, no issue
Marie I, Countess of Boulogne, married Matthew of Alsace, had issue

Notes

Sources

Marjorie Chibnall, ‘Matilda (c.1103–1152)’, Oxford Dictionary of National Biography, Oxford University Press, 2004 .
 
 
 

|-

1100s births
1152 deaths
12th-century French women
12th-century English women
12th-century Scottish women
12th-century women rulers
House of Boulogne
Counts of Boulogne
Counts of Mortain
English royal consorts
Duchesses of Normandy
Wives of knights
Women in 12th-century warfare
Scottish princesses
People of The Anarchy
Women in medieval European warfare
Year of birth uncertain
Burials at Faversham Abbey